Satsuki Shimabukuro (Japanese: 島袋 さつき, Shimabukuro Satsuki, b. 28 May 1988 in Okinawa Prefecture, Japan), better known by her stage name Meisa Kuroki (Japanese: 黒木 メイサ, Kuroki Meisa), is a Japanese actress, model and singer. She is represented by the agency Sweet Power and is signed to Sony Music Japan. She made her acting debut in 2004. She has modeled for the popular Japanese fashion magazine JJ, among others, and is the current Japanese representative for Epson and Giorgio Armani. She has appeared in numerous television dramas, commercials, films, and stage productions.

Biography

Early life and career
Kuroki was born Satsuki Shimabukuro in Okinawa, Japan. While in her second year of junior high school in Okinawa, Kuroki was discovered by a fashion scout and subsequently began modeling, initially modeling exclusively for the popular fashion magazine JJ. While studying at the Okinawa Actors School, from which she graduated in 2007, she was a member of the institution's B.B. Waves group. Kuroki is one-quarter Brazilian.

Acting career
Kuroki made her acting debut in February 2004 in the Kōhei Tsuka play Atami Satsujin Jiken: Pyonyang Kara Kita Onna Keiji (The Atami Murder Case.) Since her debut she has continued to perform in theater, notably in the Azumi stage productions in 2005 and 2006, the musical Endless Shock (2005), and most recently in Onna Nobunaga (2009) and Hiryuden 2010: Last Princess (2010). Kuroki made her television debut in 2004 in the Fuji TV drama, Medaka. She has played supporting roles in several high-rated and critically acclaimed drama series, including Haikei, Chichiue-sama (2007), Kaze no Garden (2008), and Shinzanmono (2010). Kuroki won the Television Drama Academy Award and TV Life Drama Grand Prix for Best Supporting Actress in 2009 for her role in the Fuji TV drama, Ninkyo Helper. In 2006, she starred in Chakushin Ari: Final, the final installment of the Chakushin Ari franchise, for which she earned the Golden Arrow Award for Newcomer of the Year. In 2007 she appeared in Fumihiko Sori's CGI anime film Vexille. She also starred in Subaru, the live-action, film adaptation of the Masahito Soda manga, produced by Bill Kong, and Assault Girls, directed by Mamoru Oshii. In 2010, Kuroki played the role of Yuki Mori in the live-action film Space Battleship Yamato, opposite Takuya Kimura. In 2011, Kuroki co-starred with Mikako Tabe in her first serial drama lead role in the TV Asahi drama Jiu: Keishicho Tokushuhan Sosakei.

Music career
Kuroki performed on the soundtrack of the 2007 film Crows Zero, in which she also appeared. On 21 June 2008, her debut song, "Like This", was released through the Sony Music Japan subsidiary label Studioseven Recordings. It soon was announced on 17 February 2009, that Kuroki's first EP, Hellcat, would be released on 8 April 2009. Her second EP, Attitude, was released in January 2010. In January 2011 Kuroki released her first studio album, Magazine, which peaked at number 6 on the Oricon Weekly Albums chart. She also performed "Wired Life" for Ao no Exorcist as the second ending theme.

Modeling
In addition to her modeling work for the fashion magazines JJ and 25ans, Kuroki has released two photobooks, one of her own, Love Meisa, and a joint one, Missmatch, with her best friend and actress, Maki Horikita, photographed by Kishin Shinoyama. In 2009, Kuroki was chosen as the Japanese face of international fashion brand, Emporio Armani, and she also appeared in numerous events for the brand worldwide. In 2010 Kuroki was chosen as the international face of French cosmetic brand, L'Oréal.

Personal life
On 2 February 2012, Kuroki married Jin Akanishi, a Japanese actor and pop singer best known for his work as part of the boy band KAT-TUN, and the following week, on 9 February, the media reported she was pregnant. She gave birth to their first child, a daughter named Theia, on 23 September 2012 and their second child, a son, on 6 June 2017.

Discography

Albums
 Magazine (2011)
 Unlocked (2012)

Filmography

Film

Television

Theatre

Awards and prizes

Awards

Prizes

References

External links
 
 Agency Profile
 
 
 

1988 births
21st-century Japanese actresses
Gr8! Records artists
Japanese female models
Japanese television personalities
Japanese women pop singers
Japanese people of Brazilian descent
Living people
People from Okinawa Prefecture
Sony Music Entertainment Japan artists
Studioseven Recordings artists
21st-century Japanese singers
21st-century Japanese women singers